Edrick Lee (born 18 September 1992) is an Australian professional rugby league footballer who plays as a er for the Dolphins in the NRL.

Lee previously played for the Canberra Raiders, Cronulla-Sutherland Sharks and Newcastle Knights in the National Rugby League. He has also represented the Indigenous All Stars and Queensland in the State of Origin series.

Background
Lee was born and raised in Brisbane, Queensland, Australia. He is of Aboriginal and Torres Strait Islander descent.

Lee is the cousin of NBA basketball player Patty Mills, NBL basketball player Nathan Jawai and Brisbane Broncos rugby league player Brenko Lee. Edrick's uncle is former Olympian basketballer Danny Morseu, the second Indigenous Australian to represent Australia at the Olympics in basketball.  Edrick's great uncle is Indigenous land rights activist Eddie Mabo.

Lee began playing rugby league at age 12 for Easts Mount Gravatt. A keen basketball player in his youth, Lee represented the Brisbane Bullets development squad before deciding to focus on rugby league.

Playing career

Early career
In 2010, Lee was playing rugby league in Brisbane's second division competition for Mt Gravatt, situated in the Brisbane Broncos official catchment area, when he was spotted by Souths Logan Magpies scout Brian Edwards. Edwards recruited Lee to the Magpies under 20s squad. After 8 games, Edwards contacted Canberra Raiders development officer David Hamilton, who signed Lee to play for Canberra's Toyota Cup (Under-20s) team for 2011. In his first season for the Raiders Under-20s team, Lee played 14 games scoring five tries, playing wing, second row and off the bench. 

In 2012, Lee was included in the Canberra first grade trial against the Melbourne Storm in which he scored a try. On 9 March 2012, Lee re-signed with Canberra for a further two years, until the end of the 2014 NRL season. Lee cemented his spot in the centres for the Raiders under 20s in 2012, scoring 11 tries in their first 10 games. 

One of the form players to start the year, Lee was called up to represent Queensland in the inaugural Under 20s State of Origin. Lee scored two tries in the 18–14 loss to New South Wales at Penrith Stadium.

2012
In round 12 of the 2012 NRL season, Lee made his NRL debut on the wing for the Canberra side against the South Sydney Rabbitohs in Canberra's 18–36 loss at ANZ Stadium. In his third first grade game, in round 14, against the Newcastle Knights, Lee scored his first and second NRL career tries in Canberra's 32–16 win at Hunter Stadium. Lee finished his debut year in the NRL with playing in 7 matches and scoring 6 tries. Lee was listed on 23 September in Lifestyle Uncuts' Top Ten Youngsters in the NRL, alongside players such as Nathan Green and Paul Carter.

2013
In round 13, against the Brisbane Broncos, Lee broke his arm with 15 minutes remaining. He remained on the field in Canberra's 30–18 win, resulting in Lee being praised for the toughness he showed. Lee also scored a try in the match. The fracture ended Lee's season. He had played in nine matches and scored seven tries. On 23 October, Lee re-signed with the Canberra Raiders until the end of the 2017 season.

2014
In round 3, against the Gold Coast Titans, Lee was originally ruled out for the rest of the season after tearing ligaments in his foot during Canberra's 12–24 loss. He made a return in round 22 and finished the year with two tries from eight appearances.

2015
In June, Lee was named as 18th man for Queensland leading up to game 3 of the 2015 State of Origin series. He finished the 2015 season having played in 23 matches and scored 12 tries. He was named in the Prime Minister's XIII train-on squad but was ruled out due to injury.

2016
At the start of the year, Lee was selected in the QAS Emerging Maroons squad. On 5 February, Lee was one of eight players from the Maroons emerging camp who was banned from representing Queensland for 12-months after breaking curfew in Brisbane. On 13 February, Lee played on the wing for the Indigenous All Stars against the World All Stars in the 8–12 loss at Suncorp Stadium. In the Canberra sides Preliminary Final match against the Melbourne Storm, Lee made two crucial knock-ons as Canberra lost 12–14 at AAMI Park. Lee finished the 2016 NRL season with him playing in 23 matches and scoring seven tries for the Raiders.

2017
On 23 February 2017, Lee signed a two-year deal the Cronulla-Sutherland Sharks after being released by the Raiders. Lee commented that he was "really excited to be joining the club, I can't wait for this year and I'm grateful for the opportunity." In round 1 of the 2017 NRL season, Lee made his club debut for Cronulla-Sutherland against the Brisbane Broncos, playing on the wing in the 18–26 loss at Shark Park. In round 3, against the St. George Illawarra Dragons, Lee scored his first club try for Cronulla in the 10–16 loss at Shark Park. 

Lee spent the majority of The 2017 season with Cronulla's feeder club team The Newtown Jets in The Intrust Super Premiership NSW. On 26 June 2017, Lee was held up over the line with less than four minutes to play when playing for Newtown against Wests Tigers in what some media outlets described as the bombed try of the year.  If Lee was to have scored the try it would have leveled the game for Newtown and possibly had won them the match.

2018
After spending the majority of the 2017 season in reserve grade playing for Newtown, Lee was recalled to the Cronulla team for their round 4 game against Melbourne. He scored a try on his return in Cronulla's 14–4 victory. In June, he signed a 3-year contract with the Newcastle Knights starting in 2019.

Lee made a total of 19 appearances for Cronulla in 2018 and scored 12 tries. Lee was part of the Cronulla team which made it all the way to the preliminary final but fell short of another grand final appearance losing to Melbourne 22–6.

2019
Lee moved to the Newcastle Knights ahead of the 2019 NRL season.

2020
Lee made his State of Origin debut for Queensland in Game 3 of the 2020 State of Origin series after Xavier Coates was ruled out with an injury he suffered in the pre-game captain's run. Lee scored a try in the Maroons’ series-winning victory. This would be Lee's last game for over a year after he succumbed to multiple injuries.

2022
Over 500 days since Lee's last professional game, he made his return to the NRL for the Newcastle side against the St. George Illawarra Dragons in round 6 of the 2022 season.
In May, Lee signed a two-year contract with new NRL franchise the Dolphins starting in 2023.
In round 16 of the 2022 season, Lee became the first Newcastle player to score five tries in one game, as they went on to defeat bottom placed Gold Coast 38-12. In round 23, Lee scored two tries in a 22-28 loss against Canberra.

References

External links

Newcastle Knights profile
Cronulla Sharks profile
Canberra Raiders profile
NRL profile

1992 births
Australian rugby league players
Indigenous Australian rugby league players
Indigenous All Stars players
Canberra Raiders players
Cronulla-Sutherland Sharks players
Newcastle Knights players
Queensland Rugby League State of Origin players
Mount Pritchard Mounties players
Junior Kangaroos players
Rugby league centres
Rugby league wingers
Sportsmen from Queensland
Rugby league players from Brisbane
Torres Strait Islanders
Living people